Dr. Gabriel Grant (September 4, 1826, Newark, New Jersey – November 8, 1909, Manhattan, New York) was an American doctor and Union Army major who was awarded the Medal of Honor for his actions at the American Civil War Battle of Fair Oaks. His father was Charles Grant, an officer in the War of 1812.

Grant obtained A.B. and A.M. degrees from Williams College in 1846 and graduated from the College of Physicians and Surgeons in 1851. In 1852, he worked as a surgeon in Panama during the height of the California Gold Rush (when hordes of prospectors traveled across the isthmus on their way to the gold fields by sea) and organized the American Hospital the following year. While there, he also edited the Panama Herald. He then returned to practice medicine in his hometown of Newark. In 1854, he was part of a special commission set up to fight the cholera epidemic in the city.

With the onset of the Civil War, he served as the surgeon of the 2nd Infantry Regiment of New Jersey Volunteers from June to October 1861. He was a member of French's Brigade during the Battle of Fair Oaks (better known as the Battle of Seven Pines), where his actions on June 1, 1862, earned him the Medal of Honor (awarded July 21, 1897). His Medal of Honor citation reads as follows:

In February 1863, he was appointed Medical Director of Hospitals in Evanston, Indiana, and was placed in charge of the United States Army Hospital in Madison, Indiana, on September 4 of the same year. He resigned his commission in January 1865 due to a wound he received while operating in the field.

After the war, he was elected as a companion of the New York Commandery of the Military Order of the Loyal Legion of the United States.

Grant married the "wealthy Caroline Manice" in 1864. After the war, they lived in Newark, but soon moved to New York City, where all four of their children (three sons, one daughter) were born. The eldest was the lawyer, eugenicist, and conservationist Madison Grant (1865–1937).

Gabriel Grant died at his home at 22 East 49th Street, Manhattan, New York, at the age of 83. He was survived by his wife and three sons.

See also

List of American Civil War Medal of Honor recipients: G–L

References

External links

1826 births
1909 deaths
American Civil War recipients of the Medal of Honor
Physicians from Newark, New Jersey
Union Army officers
United States Army Medal of Honor recipients
Place of death missing
Columbia University Vagelos College of Physicians and Surgeons alumni
Williams College alumni